Nikolajs Jeļisejevs (born 7 July 1994) is a Latvian professional ice hockey player who is currently under contract with Admiral Vladivostok of the Kontinental Hockey League (KHL).

Playing career
Jeļisejevs began his hockey career playing in his native Latvia, playing 12 games for DHK Latgale in the 2010–11 season. In 2011, he joined HK Rīga, the minor league affiliate of the KHL's Dinamo Rīga. He made his KHL debut for Dinamo Riga on 27 September 2014 in a win against Admiral Vladivostok.

On 12 July 2022, Jeļisejevs returned to the KHL, linking up on a one-year contract with Russian club, Admiral Vladivostok.

International play
Jelisejevs participated at the 2013 World Junior Ice Hockey Championships as a member of the Latvia men's national junior ice hockey team.

Career statistics

Regular season and playoffs

International

References

External links

1994 births
Living people
Admiral Vladivostok players
Dinamo Riga players
HK Riga players
Latvian ice hockey left wingers
Modo Hockey players
Neftyanik Almetyevsk players
Ice hockey people from Riga
Tsen Tou Jilin City players
Ice hockey players at the 2022 Winter Olympics
Olympic ice hockey players of Latvia